Simon Strübin (born 21 March 1979 in Zürich) is a Swiss curler from Erlenbach. He played lead in Switzerland men's team skipped by Ralph Stöckli on 2010 Winter Olympic Games.

Strübin played second for Stöckli at the 1998 World Junior Curling Championships where they picked up a bronze medal. In 2003, he moved to lead on the team where they won the silver medal at the 2003 Ford World Men's Curling Championship. He then was the team's alternate for the 2005 European Curling Championships and 2006 Winter Olympics before becoming lead again for the 2006 and 2007 World Championships.

Teammates 
2010 Vancouver Olympic Games

Ralph Stöckli, Skip

Jan Hauser, Third

Markus Eggler, Second

Toni Müller, Alternate

References

External links
 

1979 births
Living people
Swiss male curlers
Curlers at the 2006 Winter Olympics
Curlers at the 2010 Winter Olympics
Olympic curlers of Switzerland
Olympic bronze medalists for Switzerland
Olympic medalists in curling
Medalists at the 2010 Winter Olympics
Sportspeople from Zürich